Chief Pericoma Mezuo Okoye (born 1948) was a Nigerian singer, songwriter and traditionist. His first name 'Pericoma' could alternatively be spelled as 'Pericomo' 'Perry-Coma' and 'Perry-Koma'. He was predominantly known throughout the Igboland for his style of music and strong belief and practice of the traditional religion of the Igbo people, named Odinala.

Early life 
Okoye was born in Nigeria, specifically in Imo State, an eastern state occupied by the Igbo people of Nigeria. He was born in a community named Arondizuogu, a community that occupies three local government areas: Ideato North, Okigwe, and Onuimo. According to the biographical movie on Okoye titled Lion of Africa, it claims Okoye whilst playing as a child with his peers in the forest, mysteriously got missing and was unable to be located for several years and would later re-emerge out of the forest as a teenager who possessed diverse supernatural abilities.

Prime minister 
Okoye was prime minister of the Arondizogu community in Imo state until his death in 2017.

Music style
His music style could be best described as "oral rendition of the culture, proverbs, as well as the tradition of the Igbo people".

Acting career 
He featured in a movie titled Lion Of Africa alongside Nollywood star, Pete Edochie. The movie, which was in two parts, was a biography of his early life, his involvement sorcery related activities.

Personal life
Okoye was a firm believer and practitioner of the traditional religion of the Igbo people, Obeah.

Traditional religion
Okoye whilst alive was as much a famous sorcerer as he was a musician as described by the Nigerian News outlet, Legit. His title 'Arusi Makaja' also hints as this, as 'Arusi' when translated to English language means 'deity'.  His numerous victories during the Ito-Ebule competition during the Ikeji festival earned him the alias “Lion of Africa”.  Okoye's most notable display of supernatural powers as reported by various notable Nigerian media, was in Anambra state where he made three tax collectors who approached him in bid to inquire about his tax status incapable of moving their legs whilst standing and causing them to be affixed to a particular spot for several hours.

Significance 
Okoye was a prominent individual in Nigeria as a traditional prime minister in Imo state. He was instrumental and took notable roles in the development of the Ikeji festival held in his community. This festival which is held every April serves as a source of foreign income for Nigeria, as it attracts tourists from around the world.

Selected discography  
Isi na udoh ga-adi 
High Tension 
Ikeji Izuogu
Obodo Aghoka
Igatakwuteya Aja 
Izu Ka Mma Na Nne Ji

Death  
On February 16, 2017, he was reported dead.

References

1935 births
2017 deaths
20th-century Nigerian male singers